

Crown
Head of State – Queen Elizabeth II

Federal government
Governor General – Ray Hnatyshyn

Progressive Conservative Cabinet (until November 3)
Prime Minister –  Brian Mulroney then Kim Campbell
Deputy Prime Minister – Don Mazankowski then Jean Charest
Minister of Finance – Don Mazankowski then Gilles Loiselle
Secretary of State for External Affairs – Barbara McDougall then Perrin Beatty
Minister of National Defence – Marcel Masse then Kim Campbell then Tom Siddon
Minister of National Health and Welfare – Benoît Bouchard then Mary Collins
Minister of Industry, Science and Technology – Michael Wilson then Jean Charest
Minister of the Environment – Jean Charest then Pierre Vincent
Minister of Justice – Kim Campbell then Pierre Blais
Minister of Transport – Jean Corbeil
Minister of Communications – Perrin Beatty then Monique Landry
Minister of Fisheries and Oceans – John Crosbie then Ross Reid
Minister of Agriculture – Bill McKnight then Charlie Mayer
Minister of Public Works – Elmer MacKay then Paul Wyatt Dick
Minister of Employment and Immigration – Bernard Valcourt
Minister of Energy, Mines and Resources – Arthur Jacob Epp then  Bill McKnight then Bobbie Sparrow
Minister of Forestry – Frank Oberle then Bobbie Sparrow
Minister of Veterans Affairs – Gerald Merrithew

Liberal Cabinet (from November 4)
Prime Minister –  Jean Chrétien
Deputy Prime Minister – Sheila Copps
Minister of Finance – Paul Martin
Secretary of State for External Affairs – André Ouellet
Minister of National Defence – David Collenette
Minister of National Health and Welfare – Diane Marleau
Minister of Industry, Science and Technology – John Manley
Minister of Intergovernmental Affairs – Marcel Massé
Minister of the Environment – Sheila Copps
Minister of Justice – Allan Rock
Minister of Transport – Doug Young
Minister of Communications – Michel Dupuy
Minister of Fisheries and Oceans – Brian Tobin
Minister of Agriculture – Ralph Goodale
Minister of Public Works – David Dingwall
Minister of Employment and Immigration – Lloyd Axworthy
Minister of Energy, Mines and Resources – Anne McLellan
Minister of Forestry – Anne McLellan

Parliament
See: 34th Canadian parliament then 35th Canadian parliament

Party leaders
Bloc Québécois – Lucien Bouchard
Liberal Party of Canada – Jean Chrétien
New Democratic Party- Audrey McLaughlin
Progressive Conservative Party of Canada – Brian Mulroney then Kim Campbell then Jean Charest
Reform Party of Canada – Preston Manning

Supreme Court Justices
Chief Justice: Antonio Lamer
Beverley McLachlin
Frank Iacobucci
John C. Major
Gérard La Forest
John Sopinka
Peter deCarteret Cory
Claire L'Heureux-Dubé
Charles D. Gonthier

Other
Speaker of the House of Commons – John Allen Fraser
Governor of the Bank of Canada – John Crow
Chief of the Defence Staff – General John de Chastelain then Admiral John Anderson

Provinces

Premiers
Premier of Alberta – Ralph Klein
Premier of British Columbia – Mike Harcourt
Premier of Manitoba – Gary Filmon
Premier of New Brunswick – Frank McKenna
Premier of Newfoundland – Clyde Wells
Premier of Nova Scotia – Donald Cameron then John Savage
Premier of Ontario – Bob Rae
Premier of Prince Edward Island – Joe Ghiz then Catherine Callbeck
Premier of Quebec – Robert Bourassa
Premier of Saskatchewan – Roy Romanow
Premier of the Northwest Territories – Nellie Cournoyea
Premier of Yukon – John Ostashek

Lieutenant-governors
Lieutenant-Governor of Alberta – Gordon Towers
Lieutenant-Governor of British Columbia – David Lam
Lieutenant-Governor of Manitoba – Yvon Dumont then George Johnson
Lieutenant-Governor of New Brunswick – Gilbert Finn
Lieutenant-Governor of Newfoundland and Labrador – Frederick Russell
Lieutenant-Governor of Nova Scotia – Lloyd Roseville Crouse
Lieutenant-Governor of Ontario – Hal Jackman
Lieutenant-Governor of Prince Edward Island – Marion Reid
Lieutenant-Governor of Quebec – Martial Asselin
Lieutenant-Governor of Saskatchewan – Sylvia Fedoruk

Mayors
Toronto – June Rowlands
Montreal – Jean Doré
Vancouver – Gordon Campbell then Philip Owen
Ottawa – Jacquelin Holzman

Religious leaders
Roman Catholic Bishop of Quebec –  Archbishop Maurice Couture
Roman Catholic Bishop of Montreal –  Cardinal Archbishop Jean-Claude Turcotte
Roman Catholic Bishops of London – Bishop John Michael Sherlock
Moderator of the United Church of Canada – Stan McKay

See also
 1992 Canadian incumbents
 Events in Canada in 1993
 1994 Canadian incumbents
 Governmental leaders in 1993
 Canadian incumbents by year

1993
Incumbents
1993 in Canadian politics
Canadian leaders